USS Penobscot is a name used more than once by the U.S. Navy:

 , a gunboat launched 19 November 1861.
 , a tug placed in service 29 August 1917.
 , a tug launched 11 September 1944.

United States Navy ship names